Judith Eva Barsi (June 6, 1978 – July 25, 1988) was an American child actress. She began her career in television, making appearances in commercials and television series, as well as the 1987 film Jaws: The Revenge. She also provided the voices of Ducky in The Land Before Time and Anne-Marie in All Dogs Go to Heaven. She and her mother, Maria, were killed in July 1988 in a double murder–suicide committed in their home by her father, József Barsi.

Early life 
Barsi was born in Los Angeles County, California, on June 6, 1978, the daughter of József Istvan Barsi and Maria Barsi (née Virovacz), both immigrants to the U.S. who fled the Hungarian People's Republic following the 1956 uprising. The two immigrated at different times and met at a restaurant in California, where Maria worked as a waitress. Both had been previously married.

Career 
Maria Barsi began preparing her daughter to become an actress when Judith was five. Barsi's first role was in Fatal Vision, playing Kimberley MacDonald. She went on to appear in more than seventy commercials and guest roles on television. As well as her career in television, she appeared in several films, including Jaws: The Revenge, and provided the voices of Ducky in The Land Before Time, and Anne-Marie in All Dogs Go to Heaven.

By the time she started fourth grade, Barsi was earning an estimated $100,000 per year, which helped her family buy a three-bedroom house in West Hills, Los Angeles. Her petiteness led casting directors to cast her as children that were younger than her actual age. Her agent Ruth Hansen was quoted in the Los Angeles Times as saying that when she was ten, "she was still playing 7, 8."

Abuse and death 
As Barsi's career success increased, her father József, an alcoholic, became increasingly angry and would routinely threaten to kill himself, his wife and daughter. His drinking led to three arrests for drunk driving. In December 1986, Maria reported his threats and physical violence toward her to the police. After the police found no physical signs of abuse, she decided not to press charges against him.

After the incident with the police, József reportedly stopped drinking, but continued to threaten Maria and Judith. His various threats included cutting their throats as well as burning down the house. He also reportedly hid a telegram informing Maria that a relative in Hungary had died, in an attempt to prevent her from leaving the United States with Judith. The physical violence continued, with Barsi telling a friend that her father threw pots and pans at her, resulting in a nosebleed. As a result of her abuse, Barsi began gaining weight and developed compulsive behaviors, such as plucking out her eyelashes, and pulling out her cat's whiskers (see trichotillomania). In May 1988, after breaking down in front of her agent, Ruth Hansen, Barsi was taken by Maria to a child psychologist, who identified severe physical and emotional abuse and reported her findings to child protective services.

The investigation was dropped after Maria assured the case worker that she intended to begin divorce proceedings against József and that she and Judith were going to move into a Panorama City apartment she had recently rented as a daytime haven from him. Maria's friends urged her to follow through with the plan, but she hesitated due to her fear of losing the family home and belongings.

On July 28, 1988, the Los Angeles Times reported that three people were found dead in an apparent murder–suicide and that the bodies were believed to be those of Barsi, her mother Maria, and her father József. The article quoted Police Lt. Warren Knowles as saying a flammable liquid, likely gasoline, had been poured on the bodies of Maria and Judith by József. József's body was found in the garage, dead of a self-inflicted gunshot wound. Neighbor Eunice Daly stated she heard a gunshot around 8:30a.m. on July 27, prompting her to call the police. Barsi and her mother were buried in Forest Lawn Memorial Park, in adjoining plots.

Aftermath 
Barsi's final film, All Dogs Go to Heaven, in which she provided the speaking voice of Anne-Marie, was released posthumously in November 1989. In an interview, Don Bluth, the director of both The Land Before Time and All Dogs Go To Heaven, praised her as being "absolutely astonishing. She understood verbal direction, even for the most sophisticated situations". Bluth stated he intended to feature her extensively in his future productions. The closing credits song "Love Survives" was dedicated in her memory.

Filmography

References

External links 

 
 
 

1978 births
1988 deaths
1988 murders in the United States
20th-century American actresses
Actresses from Los Angeles
American child actresses
American film actresses
American people of Hungarian descent
American television actresses
American voice actresses
Burials at Forest Lawn Memorial Park (Hollywood Hills)
Child abuse resulting in death
Deaths by firearm in California
Filicides in California
Murdered American children
Murder–suicides in California
People murdered in California
People murdered in Los Angeles